The SNCASE SE.580 was a prototype fighter designed during World War II by the French aircraft company SNCASE. Loosely based on the pre-war Dewoitine D.520, it was intended to be powered by a Hispano-Suiza 24Z piston engine. Production began on a single prototype, but the program was cancelled before it was completed.

Specifications

See also

References

Bibliography

580
1940s French fighter aircraft